Microsoft India Private Limited is a subsidiary of American software company Microsoft Corporation, headquartered in Hyderabad, India. The company first entered the Indian market in 1990 and has since worked closely with the Indian government, the IT industry, academia and the local developer community to usher in some of the early successes in the IT market. Microsoft currently has offices in the 11 cities of Ahmedabad, Bangalore, Chennai, Hyderabad, Kochi, Kolkata, Mumbai, the NCR (New Delhi, Noida and Gurgaon) and Pune.

, Microsoft employed over 18,000 people in India, up from 8,000 in 2020. and has six business units representing the complete Microsoft product portfolio.

Microsoft India Development Center 
Located in Hyderabad, the Microsoft India Development Center (MSIDC) is Microsoft’s largest software development center outside of their headquarters in Redmond, Washington. The MSIDC teams focus on strategic and IP sensitive software product development.

Business units 
Microsoft India operates the following six business units in India.
Microsoft India (R&D) Private Limited
Microsoft Research India (MSR India)
Microsoft Services Global Delivery (MSGD)
Microsoft Corporation India Pvt. Ltd. (MCIPL)
Microsoft IT India (MSIT India)
Microsoft India Global Technical Support Center (IGTSC)

Notes

External links 

 Official site

Software companies of India
Microsoft local divisions
Indian subsidiaries of foreign companies
Information technology companies of India
International information technology consulting firms
Companies based in Hyderabad, India
Information technology companies of New Delhi
Software companies based in Mumbai
Software companies established in 1999
1999 establishments in Andhra Pradesh